In Greek mythology, Polydector may refer to the following characters:

 Polydector, an Egyptian prince and one of the sons of Aegyptus. He married the Danaid Oeme and suffered the same fate along with his brothers, except Lynceus, when their brides treacherously killed them during their wedding night.
 Polydector or Polydectus, son of Phineus and Cleopatra, and brother of Polydorus. These two sons by his first wife were blinded by Phineus because of the instigation of their stepmother, Idaea who accused them of corrupting her virtue.

Notes

Reference 

 Gaius Julius Hyginus, Fabulae from The Myths of Hyginus translated and edited by Mary Grant. University of Kansas Publications in Humanistic Studies. Online version at the Topos Text Project.

Princes in Greek mythology
Sons of Aegyptus